James O'Reilly, also known as Seamas O'Reilly, (1916–1992) was a nationalist politician in Ireland.

O'Reilly was a farmer and an activist in the Nationalist Party and was elected to Kilkeel Rural District Council.  He stood unsuccessfully for the Irish Anti-Partition League in the 1948 Armagh by-election.

O'Reilly was elected in the 1958 Northern Ireland general election, representing Mourne, holding the seat until the abolition of the Parliament of Northern Ireland in 1972. He became prominent in the 1960s, when he tried to have Orange Order parades through Kilkeel rerouted.

From February to April 1966 and February 1967 to February 1969, he was the deputy chair of Ways and Means and Deputy Speaker of the Northern Ireland House of Commons. After the 1969 Northern Ireland general election, he served as the whip of the Opposition Alliance, before succeeding Roderick O'Connor as Nationalist Party whip.  He was invited to join the Social Democratic and Labour Party on its formation, but chose to remain a Nationalist Party member.

O'Reilly stood unsuccessfully in South Down at the 1973 Northern Ireland Assembly election.

References

1916 births
1992 deaths
Members of the House of Commons of Northern Ireland 1958–1962
Members of the House of Commons of Northern Ireland 1962–1965
Members of the House of Commons of Northern Ireland 1965–1969
Members of the House of Commons of Northern Ireland 1969–1973
Nationalist Party (Ireland) members of the House of Commons of Northern Ireland
Members of the House of Commons of Northern Ireland for County Down constituencies